Ars Nova Copenhagen is a Danish vocal ensemble specialised in the interpretation of the polyphonic choral music of the Renaissance and new vocal music.
It was founded in 1979 by composer Bo Holten among others. In 1996 Hungarian conductor Tamás Vetö was appointed chief conductor by the singers in the group and Holten founded his own ensemble, Musica Ficta (Denmark). Ars Nova Copenhagen is now led by Paul Hillier, and collaborates on a regular basis with his ensemble Theatre of Voices. 

The singers of the group currently are (as of February 2023):
Soprano: Ann-Christin Wesser Ingels, Kate Macoboy, Mari Øyrehagen
Alto: Elenor Wiman, Laura Lamph, Hanne Marie le Fevre
Tenor: Jakob Skjoldborg, Luís Toscano, James Robinson 
Bass: Asger Lynge Petersen, Rasmus Kure Thomsen, Mikkel Tuxen

Selected discography

Renaissance to Baroque
 Josquin Desprez: Missa de beata virgine. Vocal Group Ars Nova & Bo Holten. Kontrapunkt
 Pierre de la Rue: Requiem, Giaches de Wert 5 Motets. Vocal Group Ars Nova & Bo Holten. Kontrapunkt 32001.
 Pierre de la Rue: Missa L'Homme Arme. Nicolas Gombert: Lugebat David Absalon, Musae Jovis. Vocal Group Ars Nova & Bo Holten. Kontrapunkt 32008
 Nicolas Gombert: Sacred Music. Vocal Group Ars Nova & Bo Holten. Kontrapunkt 32038
 Thomas Tallis: Felix Namque (I), Felix Namque (II), O Nata Lux Salvator Mundi, The Lamentations Of Jeremiah I, The Lamentations Of Jeremiah II, Videte Miraculum. Vocal Group Ars Nova & Bo Holten with Lars Ulrik Mortensen (harpsichord). Kontrapunkt 32003
 Lassus: Lagrime di San Pietro. Vocal Group Ars Nova & Bo Holten. Naxos (1995) 
 Portuguese Polyphony Manuel Cardoso, Pedro de Escobar, Manuel da Fonseca Duarte Lobo. Vocal Group Ars Nova & Bo Holten. Naxos (1995) 
 Mogens Pedersøn: Sacred Music From The court Of Christian IV: 3 Hymns from Pratum Spirituale. Ad Te Levavi Oculos Meos. Missa Quinque Vocum. John Dowland Thou Mighty God. Vocal Group Ars Nova & Bo Holten. Kontrapunkt 32100
 John Taverner: Taverner & Tudor Music I - The Western Wind. Ars Nova Copenhagen & Paul Hillier. Ars Nova Records 2006
 John Taverner: Taverner & Tudor Music II - Gloria tibi Trinitas. Ars Nova Copenhagen & Paul Hillier. Ars Nova Records (2008)
 Heinrich Schütz: The Complete Narrative Works. Lukas-Passion SWV 480 (1666), Weihnachtshistorie SWV 435 (c. 1660), Auferstehungshistorie SWV 50 (c. 1623), Die Sieben Worte, SWV 478 (before 1658), Johannes-Passion, SWV 481 (1666), Matthäus-Passion, SWV 479 (1666). Ars Nova Copenhagen & Paul Hillier. 4CD Dacapo (2011). Also available as single discs.
 Plainchant, various. The Christmas Story. Ars Nova Copenhagen, Theatre of Voices & Paul Hillier. Harmonia Mundi (2011)

Romantic
 Julens Sange - Christmas songs. Vocal Group Ars Nova & Bo Holten. Exlibris
 Årstidernes sange. Vocal Group Ars Nova & Bo Holten. Exlibris
 Carl Nielsen: Songs. Vocal Group Ars Nova & Bo Holten. Exlibris
 Fædrelandssange. Vocal Group Ars Nova & Tamás Vetö. Exlibris
 The Golden Age of Danish Partsongs. Music by Nielsen, Kuhlau, Weyse, Hartmann, Gade, Laub, Heise, Schultz and Nørholm. Ars Nova Copenhagen & Paul Hillier. Dacapo (2014)

Contemporary
 Bo Holten: Sønderjysk Sommer Symfoni. Vocal Group Ars Nova & Bo Holten. Exlibris
 Per Nørgård: Den Foruroligende Ælling. Vocal Group Ars Nova & Ivan Hansen. Exlibris
 New Music For Choir - Hans Abrahamsen Universe Birds. Pelle Gudmundsen-Holmgreen Konstateringer. Bo Holten Grundtvig Motets. Per Nørgård Wie Ein Kind. Poul Ruders 2 Motets. Sven-David Sandström En Ny Himmel Och En Ny Jord. Vocal Group Ars Nova & Bo Holten. Kontrapunkt 32016
 Ib Nørholm: Elverspejl (The Elf Mirror), Pavlovski, Resmark, Hoyer, Vocal Group Ars Nova & Frans Rasmussen. Kontrapunkt 1996
 Bo Holten: Orfeo-Fragmenter I-VI. Niels Rosing-Schow Sommerfugledalen. Exlibris 30055 (1996)
 Ib Nørholm: Choral Works. Americana op.89, MacMoon Songs III op.154, Sjaefuld Sommer op. 146, 3 Lieder, Fuglene op.129. Vocal Group Ars Nova, Danish Chamber Players & Tamás Vetö. Dacapo
 Pelle Gudmundsen-Holmgreen: Works for Voices and Instruments. Vocal Group Ars Nova, Athelas Sinfonietta Copenhagen & Ivan Hansen. Dacapo
 Per Nørgård. Singe die Gärten Works for Choir I. Vocal Group Ars Nova & Tamás Vetö. Dacapo 
 Per Nørgård. Mythic Morning - Works for Choir II. Vocal Group Ars Nova & Tamás Vetö. Dacapo 2005
 Rued Langgaard: Rose Garden Songs Dacapo. Vocal Group Ars Nova & Tamás Vetö. reissued 2009 
 Terry Riley. In C. Ars Nova Copenhagen & Paul Hillier. Ars Nova Records 2006
 Per Nørgård: Lygtemaendene tager til byen (The Will-o'-the-Wisps Go to Town), Dam-Jensen, Kihlberg, Gjerris, Henning-Jensen, Jensen, Ars Nova Copenhagen, Danish National Symphony Orchestra & Thomas Dausgaard. Dacapo
 Svend Nielsen (b. 1937). Sommerfugledalen, for 12 solo voices. (Also includes a reading of the poem by the poet recorded in 1991 for the earlier Kontrapunkt release). Ars Nova Copenhagen & Tamás Vetö. Dacapo 2007
 David Lang (composer). The little Match Girl Passion. Theatre of Voices, Ars Nova Copenhagen & Paul Hillier. Harmonia Mundi 2009
 Pelle Gudmundsen-Holmgreen (b. 1932). The Natural World of Pelle Gudmundsen-Holmgreen. Ars Nova Copenhagen & Paul Hillier. Dacapo 2010
 A Bridge of Dreams. Lou Harrison (America, 1917-2003) Mass for Saint Cecilia's Day (1983). Ross Edwards (composer) (Australia, b. 1943) Sacred Kingfisher Psalms (2009). Jack Body (New Zealand, b.1944) Five Lullabies (1989). Liu Sola (China, b.1955) The Seafarer to a text of Kevin Crossley-Holland (2009). Anne Boyd (Australia, b.1946) As I crossed a bridge of Dreams'' (1975). A cappella music from Australia and New Zealand. Andrew Lawrence-King, Ars Nova Copenhagen & Paul Hillier. Ars Nova Records 2011
 Arvo Pärt (b. 1935). Creator Spiritus. Ars Nova Copenhagen & Paul Hillier. Harmonia Mundi (2012)
 Bent Sørensen (composer) (b. 1958)/ Johannes Ockeghem. Fragments of Requiem. Ars Nova Copenhagen & Paul Hillier. Dacapo 2012
 John Cage: The Complete John Cage Edition Volume 18: The Choral Works 1. Ars Nova Copenhagen & Paul Hillier. Mode Records
 Axel Borup-Jørgensen: Carambolage: Works for ensemble and voice. Århus Sinfonietta, Ars Nova Copenhagen, Søren Kinch Hansen. Dacapo 2014
 Pablo Ortiz: Gallos y Huesos | Notker. Ars Nova Copenhagen and Paul Hillier. Orchid Records 2015
 "First Drop". Howard Skempton: "Rise up my love"; Michael Gordon: "He Saw a Skull"; David Lang: "When we were children"; Kevin Volans: "Walking Song [organ]"; Pablo Ortiz: "Five Monets"; Louis Andriessen: "Un beau baiser"; Gabriel Jackson: "L'homme armé"; Howard Skempton: "More sweet than my refrain"; Steve Reich: "Know what is above you"; Steve Reich: "Clapping Music" (arr. Paul Hillier); Terry Riley: "Mexico City Blues"

References

External links
 Homepage of Ars Nova Copenhagen

Danish choirs
Musical groups established in 1979